is a train station in Nishi-ku, Nagoya, Aichi Prefecture, Japan.

Lines
 Nagoya Railroad
 Inuyama Line

Layout

Platforms

Adjacent stations

|-
!colspan=5|Nagoya Railroad

Railway stations in Japan opened in 1912
Railway stations in Aichi Prefecture